Purple Mountain or Zijin Shan is located on the eastern side of Nanjing in Jiangsu province, China. It is 448.2 m (1467 ft) high. Its peaks are often found enveloped in purple and golden clouds at dawn and dusk, hence its name.

A small mountain with an area of about 20 square kilometers (4,900 acres), the altitude of Purple Mountain at the top and foot of the mountain is about 449 m and 20 m respectively. The annual average rainfall is 1,000 mm to 1,050 mm, and the average annual sunshine time is about 2,213 hours. Purple Mountain is a mountain related to many historical events of both ancient and modern China. It was originally known as Bell Mountain and also became known as Mount Jiang after Sun Quan named Jiang Ziwen, an Eastern Han official whose spirit was said to haunt the site, as the mountain's god during the Three Kingdoms era. The name Zijin means "copper" - when copper is pure, it appears purple in color, so in Chinese, it is also called purple-gold. It is also named Mount Jinling, due to its purple rocks. Jinling means "the mount of purple-gold". It is the origin of the nickname "Jinling" of Nanjing. During the Ming dynasty, it was also called Mount Shenlie.

More than 200 heritage and scenic tourist sites are now located in or around the mountain, including three national historical sites, nine provincial historical sites, and 33 prefectural historical sites. Located in or close to the hillside of the mountain, there are also about a dozen national research institutes and universities. The Sun Yat-sen Mausoleum, the tomb of Sun Yat-sen, is located at the foot of the mountain.

Purple Mountain has 621 species of vascular plants, from 383 genera, 118 families (including 78 cultivated species).

See also
 Linggu Temple
 Ming Xiaoling Mausoleum
 Purple Mountain Observatory
 Sun Yat-sen Mausoleum

References

External links 

  Purple-Gold Mountain Observatory, the first and largest observatory of China
 Location List of Imperial Tombs of the Ming and Qing Dynasties, one UNESCO World Heritage Site
 Zhongshan Journal '''

Geography of Nanjing
Parks in Nanjing
Major National Historical and Cultural Sites in Jiangsu
Tourist attractions in Nanjing
Mountains of Jiangsu